Governor Island may refer to:

 Governor Island (Connecticut), United States
 Governor Island (Tasmania), Australia
 Governor Island (Georgian Bay), Ontario Kanada 
 Governor Island, Falkland Islands

See also
 Governors Island (disambiguation)